The Barton Creek Greenbelt located in Austin, Texas is managed by the City of Austin's Park and Recreation Department. The Greenbelt is a  stretch of public land that begins at Zilker Park and stretches South/Southwest to the final section commonly referred to as "The Hill of Life" which ends in the Woods of Westlake subdivision. The Barton Creek Greenbelt consists of three areas: the Lower Greenbelt, the Upper Greenbelt, and the Barton Creek Wilderness Park and is characterized by large limestone cliffs, dense foliage, and shallow bodies of water.

Climate 
Located in Austin, Texas, the Barton Creek Greenbelt has a humid subtropical climate characterized by hot summers and mild winters. The Greenbelt receives  of rain, with the majority of the precipitation coming in the spring, and second-highest in the fall. Small bodies of water can be found at all times of the year throughout the Greenbelt, however the creek bed that runs along the spine of the Greenbelt actively flows only 1 to 2 months out of the year depending on precipitation levels. Watershed from Barton Creek, a tributary that feeds the Colorado River in Central Texas, is responsible for the area's highly concentrated vegetation.

Sports and recreation 
With its diverse terrain, the Greenbelt is a popular location for adventure-loving locals. The large limestone cliffs that line portions of the Greenbelt make for excellent rock climbing. Hikers and bikers can be found year-round, although during the wet season mountain biking is more challenging as the biking trails crisscross the creek bed, making it difficult to cross when it is full, although in recent years the addition of the pedestrian bridge along MoPac makes moving between the north and south side easier. During years of heavy rainfall the water level of the creek rises high enough to allow swimming, cliff diving, kayaking, and tubing. During the annual "Tubin the Belt" parade hundreds of individuals tube the greenbelt on a Saturday in Spring.

Barton Creek Greenbelt is also a popular site for cavers, owing to the presence of Airmen's Cave, which, at two miles (3 km), is the longest cave in Travis County, Texas. After many novice spelunkers became lost exploring the cave and required rescue, the entrance to the cave was sealed by a locked steel grate. It has scheduled openings for guided exploration arranged with Austin area spelunking organizations.

History 

William Barton gave his name to the creek that created the Greenbelt when he settled on its banks in 1837.

On September 7, 1974, Bradfield, Cummins sold 132.34 acres to the City of Austin for parkland. Another 0.88 acre parcel was purchased July 24, 1982.

The trail running along the Greenbelt has an interesting history. For example, the last section, called "The Hill of Life" used to be closed. John Hartman orchestrated a meeting with the Parks and Rec board to get the trail on it opened. The residents in the subdivision at the top of the hill had cut a deal with Parks & Rec to keep it closed; Hartman turned up at least 10 major neighborhood groups to argue against the special deal and prevailed.

During the 1970s and 1980s, hikers had to find ways over, under and around the fences placed to keep them from accessing the creek's cool clear water and free swimming holes. The initial Greenbelt "River Rats" made it clear to all users:
 "you carried the trash in...you carry the trash out! Don't let your trash mess up our clear creeks and rivers!"

In March 2009, The Trust for Public Land donated  of land to the Greenbelt, in addition to the  they donated in early 2007. Previously, between 1992 and 1999, TPL purchased nearly 1,000 acres of land in the Barton Creek watershed and donated it to the city, transforming a thin stretch of public land into a major metropolitan park. The organization hoped to continue expansion of the trail network in the area in coming years.

Maintenance
In 2011, the City of Austin's maintenance team was assisted by five AmeriCorps members from American YouthWorks Texas Conservation Corps. The crew completed over 100 projects throughout the Greenbelt in the form of erosion control, habitat restoration and GIS mapping. The crew was funded through donations by Impact Austin, Austin Parks Foundation, and Hill Country Conservancy. Other nonprofits, including Greenbelt Guardians, Central Texas Mountaineers and the Austin Ridgeriders also play a big role in volunteer maintenance. Many of these agencies come together to organize a major volunteer day, National Trails Day, every year on the first Saturday in June.

Locations 
Popular Barton Creek Greenbelt locations include: Twin Falls, Campbell's Hole, The Flats, Gus Fruh, and Sculpture Falls.

References

Sources

External links
 City of Austin Parks and Recreation Department: Greenbelts
 Map of Barton Creek Greenbelt from Austin Parks & Recreation

Forests of Texas
Urban forests in the United States
Parks in Austin, Texas
Green belts
Protected areas of Travis County, Texas